KJFM is a radio station airing a country music format licensed to Louisiana, Missouri, broadcasting on 102.1 MHz FM.  The station is owned by Foxfire Communications, Inc.

References

External links

Country radio stations in the United States
JFM